Mice Follies is a 1960 Warner Bros. Looney Tunes cartoon directed by Robert McKimson. The short was released on August 20, 1960. It was the third and last of McKimson's parodies of Jackie Gleason's The Honeymooners, following The Honey-Mousers (1956) and Cheese It, the Cat! 
(1957).

Plot
Ralph Crumden and Ned Morton are walking home from the Raccoon Lodge at two o'clock in the morning. Ned stops to lasso a cat, but when Ralph grabs the cord, he gets dragged in and pounded by the cat.

The cat enters the house next to Ralph's house, waiting for a chance to grab the mice. The cat puts his mouth against the mouse hole so that Ralph and Ned enter the cat's body. Ralph lights a match in the darkness, making smoke, Ned thinks the "place" is a barbeque ribs joint, and the cat regurgitates the mice. The mice walk on, thinking they entered the wrong place. The cat goes into Ralph's house through a grate. Ralph and Ned cautiously enter the house, thinking their wives are sleeping soundly. Ralph greets "Alice" and grabs her new fur coat, ripping a piece of fur off the cat. In response, the cat slices Ralph. Ned tries to talk with "Trixie", but the cat massacres Ned. Both mice march in to confront their "wives." However, the cat beats them up and the two mice go to sleep at the park to get away from their "aggressive wives".

Alice and Trixie return from the movies to Ralph's house cautiously entering, but the cat beats them up as well. Both ladies go to sleep at the park to get away from their "aggressive husbands". However, unknown to them, their husbands are asleep on the other side of the same bench.

References

External links

1960 animated films
1960 short films
1960 films
Looney Tunes shorts
Warner Bros. Cartoons animated short films
Animation based on real people
1960s parody films
Films based on television series
Animated films about mice
American parody films
Films directed by Robert McKimson
Animated films about cats
Films scored by Milt Franklyn
1960 comedy films
1960s Warner Bros. animated short films
1960s English-language films
The Honeymooners